A ferro (plural ferri) or  is an item of functional wrought-iron work on the façade of an Italian building. Ferri are a common feature of Medieval and Renaissance architecture in Lazio, Tuscany and Umbria.

In Florence, ferri da cavallo and arpioni were often made to resemble the head of a lion, the symbolic marzocco of the Republic of Florence. Later, cats, dragons, horses and fantastic animals were also represented.

References

Further reading

 Assunta Maria Adorisio (1996). Per Uso e Per Decoro: L’arte del ferro a Firenze e in Toscana dal eta gotica al XX secolo. Florence: Maria Christina de Montemayor.
 Giulio Ferrari. ([1920?]) Il ferro nell'arte Italiana. Centosettanta tavole riproduzioni in parte inedite di 368 soggetti, del medio evo, del rinascimento, del periodo barocco e neo-classico raccolte e ordinate con testo esplicativo. Kraus Reprint, 1973.
 James Lindow (2007). The Renaissance Palace in Florence: magnificence and splendor in fifteenth-century Italy. Aldershot, England; Burlington, VT: Ashgate.
 Claudio Paolini. Repertorio delle architettura civili di Firenze. [Database] Palazzo Spinelli – Ente Cassa di Risparmio di Firenze.
 Augusto Pedrini (1929). Il ferro battuto, sbalzato e cesellato, nell-arte italiana, dal secolo undicesimo al secolo diciottesimo. Milan: Ulrico Hoepli. (Published in English: Decorative ironwork of Italy. Atglen PA: Schiffer Publishers, 2010.)
 Urbano Quinto (1998). Gli antichi segreti del fabbro. Galleria Urbano Quinto.
 Herbert Railton (1900). Pen drawings of Florence. Cleveland, Ohio: J.H. Jansen.
 John Superti (2014). I Cavalli di Firenze = The Horses of Florence. Florence: Polistampa.
 John Superti (2013) Florence's Ironworks - Ferri https://www.youtube.com/watch?v=zKQ5s9Lk1Bo

Architectural elements